The  Chrysler Valiant AP6 is an automobile which was produced by Chrysler Australia from 1965 to 1966. It was the fourth Chrysler Valiant model produced in Australia.

Overview
The Valiant AP6 was released in March 1965, replacing the Chrysler Valiant AP5. The basic styling was carried over from the AP5 but differed in having a new split grille, a new bonnet and new front mudguards. Mechanical changes included a redesigned camshaft, the introduction of self-adjusting brakes and the replacement of the push button gear selector on models with automatic transmission by a traditional lever system. Optional power brakes were made available across the range.

A coupe utility variant was added to the range in April 1965 and marketed as the Valiant Wayfarer. This was the first Valiant-based coupe utility to be produced by Chrysler Australia.

As with the previous AP5 model, station wagon rear styling varied depending on production dates. Early build wagons used 1965 US Plymouth Valiant wagon-style tail lights. At some time in the production run Chrysler Australia invested in new tooling for the wagon rear sheet metal, allowing the use of sedan rear doors. Later style wagons again used vertical style tail lights. The new pressings required revised rear cargo area side windows and rear bumpers were also redesigned. Changes occurred from build number AP6-2W-3107 (manual Safari), AP6-4W-2167 (automatic Safari), AP6-4HW-1418 (Regal Safari) and AP6-4WHV-209 (V8 Safari). The difference in sheet metal is most notable where the rear bumpers on the later versions finish. On early build cars the rear bumper ends lead into a pressing on the lower rear quarter panel sheet metal, whereas on later build cars the bumper has curved ends with a flat sheet metal surface on the lower rear quarters.

Valiant V8 models were released in August 1965. A V8 sedan and V8 Safari wagon were offered, both powered by a  V8 engine with “TorqueFlite 8” automatic transmission. V8 models could be identified by V8 badges, with the V8 sedan having a vinyl roof and the V8 Safari wagon being fitted with a roof rack. Power-assisted brakes were standard equipment. Although it utilized Regal trim and equipment, the V8 was marketed as the Valiant V8, not as a Valiant Regal V8.

Model range
The Valiant AP6 was offered in 4-door sedan, 5-door station wagon and 2-door coupé utility body styles in ten models.
 
 Valiant manual sedan (AP6-2)
 Valiant automatic sedan (AP6-4) 
 Valiant Regal sedan (AP6-4H)
 Valiant V8 sedan (AP6-4PV)
 Valiant Safari manual wagon (AP6-2W)
 Valiant Safari automatic wagon (AP6-4W)
 Valiant Regal Safari wagon (AP6-4WH)
 Valiant V8 Safari wagon (AP6-4WHV)
 Valiant Wayfarer manual utility (AP6-2U)
 Valiant Wayfarer automatic utility (AP6-4U)

Engines and transmissions
A  Straight-six engine was fitted to all models except the Valiant V8, which was powered by a  V8 engine. Three speed manual and three speed automatic transmissions were offered.

Production and replacement
A total of 43,344 Valiant AP6s were produced prior to its replacement by the Valiant VC in 1966.

References

Cars of Australia
Valiant vehicles
Valiant
Cars introduced in 1965